The Jingpho-Luish, Jingpho-Asakian, Kachin–Luic, or Kachinic languages are a group of Sino-Tibetan languages belonging the Sal branch. They are spoken in eastern India and Burma, and consist of the Jingpho (also known as Kachin) language and the Luish ( Asakian) languages Sak, Kadu, Ganan, Andro, Sengmai, and Chairel. Ethnologue and Glottolog include the extinct or nearly extinct Taman language in the Jingpo branch, but Huziwara (2016) considers it to be unclassified within Tibeto-Burman.

James Matisoff (2013) provides phonological and lexical evidence in support of the Jingpho-Asakian (Jingpho–Luish) grouping, dividing it into two subgroups, namely Jingphoic and Asakian. Proto-Luish has been reconstructed by Huziwara (2012) and Matisoff (2013).

Jingpho-Luish languages contain many sesquisyllables.

Classification
Matisoff (2013), citing Huziwara (2012), provides the following Stammbaum classification for the Jingpho-Asakian (Jingpho-Luish) branch. Jingphoic internal classification is from Kurabe (2014).
Jingpho-Asakian (Jingpho-Luish)
Jingphoic
Southern: Standard Jingpho, Nkhum, Shadan, Gauri, Mengzhi, Thingnai dialects
Northern
Northeastern: Dingga, Duleng, Dingphan, Jilí (Dzili), Khakhu, Shang, Tsasen dialects
Northwestern (Singpho): Diyun, Numphuk, Tieng, Turung dialects
Asakian
Cak
Cak
Sak
Chairel
Loi
Sengmai
Andro
Kadu
Ganan
Kadu

References

Bibliography
 George van Driem (2001). Languages of the Himalayas: An Ethnolinguistic Handbook of the Greater Himalayan Region. Brill.

Sal languages
Languages of India
Languages of Myanmar
Languages of China